Decota is an unincorporated community in Kanawha County, West Virginia, United States.

Decota is a name derived from the Dakota language meaning "allies".

References

Unincorporated communities in Kanawha County, West Virginia
Unincorporated communities in West Virginia
Coal towns in West Virginia